Pieve del Cairo is a comune (municipality) in the Province of Pavia in the Italian region of Lombardy, located about 60 km southwest of Milan and about 30 km southwest of Pavia. As of 31 December 2004, it had a population of 2,179 and an area of 25.5 km2.

Pieve del Cairo borders the municipalities of Ferrera Erbognone, Galliavola, Gambarana, Isola Sant'Antonio, Mede, Mezzana Bigli, and Villa Biscossi.

Demographic evolution

Images

References

Cities and towns in Lombardy